Nina Kossova (born 9 June 1935) is a Soviet athlete. She competed in the women's high jump at the 1952 Summer Olympics.

References

1935 births
Living people
Athletes (track and field) at the 1952 Summer Olympics
Soviet female high jumpers
Olympic athletes of the Soviet Union
Place of birth missing (living people)